Piotr Michalski (born 27 July 1994) is a Polish speed skater.

Career
At the 2016 ISU World Cup in Heerenveen his team, consisting of Artur Nogal and Sebastian Klosinski won the bronze medal in the men Team sprint event. 
Piotr won the bronze medal in the Team sprint event at the 2018 European Speed Skating Championships in Kolomna together with Artur Nogal and Sebastian Klosinski.
He is trained by Tuomas Nieminen, a retired finnish speed skater.

References

External links

1994 births
Living people
Sportspeople from Podkarpackie Voivodeship
People from Sanok
Polish male speed skaters
Speed skaters at the 2018 Winter Olympics
Speed skaters at the 2022 Winter Olympics
Olympic speed skaters of Poland
World Sprint Speed Skating Championships medalists